

Events
Kansas City mobster Joseph Benintende is imprisoned after being convicted for his role in the NCAA point shaving scandal.
May 2 – Meyer Lansky is convicted of illegal gambling, after pleading guilty to five of the total twenty one charges, and serves three months in a New York prison. He is additionally fined $2,500 and, after his release, receives three years probation.
June 19 – Stephen Franse, a police informant, is murdered by Genovese crime family hitman Joe Valachi.
July 16 – Shortly after his release from prison, Joe Adonis is faced with perjury charges.
August 5 – U.S. Attorney General Herbert Brownell Jr. orders the deportation of Joe Adonis after it is found Adonis had lied of his birthplace in Passaic, New Jersey and found to have immigrated from Naples, Italy.
October 29 – New York mobster Frank Costello is released from prison, following his arrest for contempt of court during the Kefauver Committee the previous year.
December 9 - Dominick Petrilli, sneaking into the United States shortly after being deported, is killed by rival gunman. Petrilli had brought Joe Valachi, later a government informant, into the Genovese crime family.

Arts and literature

Births

Deaths
June 19 – Stephen Franse, NYPD police informant
December 9 - Dominick Petrilli, New York mobster

Organized crime
Years in organized crime